François Yinga (born 1966) is a Cameroonian wrestler. He competed in the men's freestyle 62 kg at the 1988 Summer Olympics.

References

1966 births
Living people
Cameroonian male sport wrestlers
Olympic wrestlers of Cameroon
Wrestlers at the 1988 Summer Olympics
Place of birth missing (living people)